Benarty is the name informally used to refer to the ex-mining towns of Ballingry and Lochore and the villages of Crosshill, Lochcraig and Glencraig. The area is situated north of Lochgelly, Fife. The name comes from Benarty Hill, locally simply Benarty, a prominent local landmark, at 356m high.

See also
List of places in Fife

References

Mining communities in Fife